

Events 
February 16 – Composer William Boyce is buried in St Paul's Cathedral. The music at his funeral features the massed choirs of St Paul's itself, Westminster Abbey and the Chapel Royal.
March 7 – Griffith Jones, aged about 21, is recommended for membership of the Royal Society of Musicians.
April – The London Magazine reports on the organ-playing of three-year-old prodigy William Crotch.
December 26 – Teatro alla Scala in Milan opens its operatic carnival season with Josef Mysliveček's new opera Armida.
The opera house at Eszterháza burns down.
Mezzo-soprano Luigia Polzelli and her violinist husband Antonio arrive at the Esterházy court, where she quickly becomes the lover of Joseph Haydn.

Opera 
Johann Christian Bach – Amadis de Gaule (premiered Dec. 14 in Paris)
Domenico Cimarosa 
L'infedeltà fedele
L'italiana in Londra (premiered Dec. 28 in Rome)
Il matrimonio per raggiro
Christoph Willibald Gluck – Iphigénie en Tauride (premiered May 18 in Paris)
André Ernest Modeste Grétry – L'amant jaloux (first published, premiered 1778)
Joseph Haydn – L'isola disabitata
Wolfgang Amadeus Mozart – Zaide
Giovanni Paisiello – Demetrio, R.1.59
Antonio Salieri – Il Talismano

Classical music 
Anna Amalia – Organ Trio in C major
Carl Philipp Emanuel Bach 
Clavier-Sonaten für Kenner und Liebhaber, Wq.55
Rondo in E major, Wq. 57, H.265
Rondo in F major, Wq. 57, H.266
Claude-Bénigne Balbastre – Sonates en Quatuor, Op. 3 (Paris)
William Billings – Music in Miniature
William Boyce – 10 Voluntaries for the Organ
Muzio Clementi 
6 Sonatas, Op. 2
3 Piano Duets and 3 Sonatas, Op. 3
François Joseph Gossec – Symphonie Concertante du Ballet de Mirza, B.90
Joseph Haydn 
Symphony No. 70 in D major
Symphony No. 71 in B-flat major, Hob.I:71
Symphony No. 75 in D Major
Aria: "Quando la rosa"
Michael Haydn – Symphony No.23 in D major, MH 287, P.43
Johann Adam Hiller – "Lieder und Arien aus Sophiens Reise", compilation including pieces from Mozart.
Wolfgang Amadeus Mozart
Kommet her, ihr frechen Sünder, K.146/317b
Mass in C major, K.317 (Composed March 23, Premiered April 4 in Salzburg)
Symphony No.32 in G major, K.318 (Composed April 26)
Symphony No.33 in B-flat major, K.319
Serenade in D major, "Posthorn" K.320
Vesperae solennes de Dominica in C. K.341
Church Sonata in C major, K.329/317a
2 Marches, K.335/320a
Sinfonia Concertante for Violin, Viola and Orchestra in E-flat major, K.364/320d
Concerto in E-flat major for Two Pianos, K.365/316a
Johann Heinrich Rolle – Thirza und ihre Söhne (oratorio)
Joseph Bologne Saint-Georges – 2 Symphonies, Op.11
Antonio Salieri – Organ Concerto in C major
William Shrubsole – "Miles's Lane (All Hail The Power of Jesus' Name)", in The Gospel Magazine and Moral Miscellany, Vol.6.
Maria Carolina Wolf – "Die Rose"
Carl Friedrich Zelter – Viola Concerto in E-flat major

Methods and theory writings
Joseph Amiot – Mémoire sur la musique des Chinois
Anton Bemitzrieder – Nouvel essai sur l'harmonie
François Vincent Corbelin – Méthode de Harpe
Franz Paul Rigler – Anleitung zum Klavier
Francisco Inácio Solano – 
Francesco Antonio Vallotti – Della scienza teorica e pratica della moderna musica (On the scientific theory and practice of modern music)

Births 
January 8 – John White, organist and composer
January 15 – Jean Coralli, ballet producer and choreographer
February 1 – Nikolaus von Krufft, Austrian composer (died 1818)
February 2 – Georg Heinrich Lux, organist and composer (died 1861)
February 5 – François van Campenhout, singer and composer (d. 1848)
February 17 – Wilhelm Friedrich Riem, composer (died 1857)
February 22 – Joachim Nicolas Eggert, composer (d. 1813)
February 23 – Johann Caspar Aiblinger, composer (d. 1867)
February 28 – Henry Darondeau, composer (died 1865)
March 1 – Jacob Gottfried Weber, composer (d. 1839)
March 13 – Oliver Shaw, composer (d. 1848)
April 11 – Louise Reichardt, German composer (died 1826)
April 21 – William Knyvett, composer
May 28 – Thomas Moore, poet and lyricist
June 23 – Johann Baptist Schiedermayr, composer (died 1840)
July 20 – Ignaz Schuster, bass and composer (died 1835)
August 1 – Francis Scott Key, songwriter (died 1843) 
September 8 – Johann Philipp Samuel Schmidt, composer (died 1853) 
September 10 – Louis Alexandre Piccinni, composer
October 15 
August Ferdinand Häser, composer (died 1844)
Johan Olof Wallin, songwriting bishop
November 14 – Adam Oehlenschläger poet and lyricist (died 1850)
date unknown
Georges-Joseph-Laurent Lambert, composer (died 1852)

Deaths 
January 20 – David Garrick, librettist (born 1717)
February 7 – William Boyce, composer, 69
February 12 – Hinrich Philip Johnsen, composer (born 1717)
April 6 – Tommaso Traetta, composer, 52
April 7 – Martha Ray, singer, 32/33 (murdered)
June 6 – Joseph Inchbald, actor and singer, 44
November 27 – Josse Boutmy, organist and harpsichordist, 82
December 5 – Hermann Anton Gelinek, organist and violinist, 70
December 28 – Gennaro Manna, composer, 64
December - Richard Morris, collector of folk songs, 76
unknown date – Edward Jones, Welsh composer, 49/50

References

 
18th century in music
Music by year